Françoise Castex (born 7 February 1956) is a French politician.

Education
Castex was born in Agadir and obtained a degree and master's degree in arts in the 1970s. In 1990 she obtained a Diploma of Advanced Studies in the Social Field (DHEPS), and the following year a Postgraduate diploma in educational science.

Early career
 1981-1998: Adult and youth education adviser at the Gers Departmental Youth and Sports Directorate
 1998-2000: Adviser in the office of the Chairman of the Gers Departmental Council
 Adviser in the office of the Minister responsible for vocational education
 2002-2004: Special adviser for educational cooperation in the Foreign Ministry
 2004-2014: Member of the European Parliament (S&D)
 1989-1998: Deputy Secretary-General of the Adult Education Association (SEP-FEN-UNSA)
 since 1990: Member of the Socialist Party national council
 1996-2001: Member of Lavardens Municipal Council
 1990-1998: Chairwoman of the Gers League of Human Rights
 1996-1998: Member of the Central committee of the League of Human Rights

Member of the European Parliament, 2004–2014
Between 2004 and 2014, Castex served as a Member of the European Parliament for the South West of France with the Socialist Party, part of the Socialist Group and sat on the European Parliament's Committee on International Trade.

She was a substitute for the Committee on Development and the Committee on Employment and Social Affairs. She also served as a member of the
Delegation for relations with the Palestinian Legislative Council.

Together with Liêm Hoang Ngoc, Castex was one of two sitting MEPs who were not re-nominated by the leadership of France's Socialist Party for the 2014 European elections.

References

External links

 
 

1956 births
Living people
People from Agadir
MEPs for South-West France 2004–2009
MEPs for South-West France 2009–2014
21st-century women MEPs for France
Socialist Party (France) MEPs